Saddle nose is a condition associated with nasal trauma, congenital syphilis, relapsing polychondritis, granulomatosis with polyangiitis, cocaine abuse, and leprosy, among other conditions. The most common cause is nasal trauma. It is characterized by a loss of height of the nose, because of the collapse of the bridge. The depressed nasal dorsum may involve bony, cartilaginous, or both bony and cartilaginous components of the nasal dorsum.

It can usually be corrected with augmentation rhinoplasty by filling the dorsum of the nose with cartilage, bone or synthetic implant. If the depression is only cartilaginous, cartilage is taken from the nasal septum or auricle and laid in single or multiple layers. If deformity involves both cartilage and bone, cancellous bone from iliac crest is the best replacement. Autografts are preferred over allografts. Saddle deformity can also be corrected by synthetic implants of teflon or silicon, but they are likely to be extruded.

See also 
 Saber shin
 List of cutaneous conditions

References

External links 

Congenital disorders of musculoskeletal system
Bacterium-related cutaneous conditions
Syphilis
Nose